Bob King (aka Robert B. King) is the editor and general manager of Classic Images, a monthly tabloid of 60 to 144 pages with news and articles about movies and movie people of the past, primarily pre-1960. He is also the editor and general manager of Films of the Golden Age, a quarterly magazine for movie enthusiasts.

Personal information
Robert Boyd King was born in Iowa City, Iowa on 17 October 1949. He graduated from the University of Iowa in 1972.

Other projects
He is the co-author of the autobiographical I Wasn't Like the Cautious Man: The Life of Roy C. Smith As Told to Robert B. King. It details the life and career of Roy C. Smith the founder of American Petroleum Company based in Davenport, Iowa.

References

1949 births
Living people
Writers from Iowa City, Iowa
University of Iowa alumni